Elaphrus angulonotus is a species of ground beetle in the subfamily Elaphrinae. It was described by Shi & Liang in 2008.

References

Elaphrinae
Beetles described in 2008